Sergei Petrovich Zhukov (born 23 November 1975) is a Russian former professional ice hockey player who last played for Lokomotiv Yaroslavl of the Kontinental Hockey League (KHL).

Career statistics

Regular season and playoffs

International

External links

1975 births
Boston Bruins draft picks
HC Sibir Novosibirsk players
Ice hockey players at the 2006 Winter Olympics
Living people
Lokomotiv Yaroslavl players
Olympic ice hockey players of Russia
Sportspeople from Novosibirsk
Russian ice hockey defencemen